The Renault R28 is a Formula One racing car, with which Renault F1 contested the 2008 Formula One season. The chassis was designed by Bob Bell, James Allison, Tim Densham and Dino Toso with Pat Symonds overseeing the design and production of the car as Executive Director of Engineering and Rob White leading the engine design. The car was driven by Fernando Alonso and Nelson Piquet Jr.

Launch
 Similarly to Honda, Renault arrived at Valencia with their contender a week before its official launch, giving the first laps of the R28 to Fernando Alonso on January 21, 2008. The car was officially launched on January 31, 2008 at Renault's communications headquarters in Boulogne-Billancourt, on the banks of the Seine in south-west Paris. Renault unveiled rookie Nelson Piquet Jr. as Alonso's team mate for the 2008 season, and confirmed Lucas di Grassi, Romain Grosjean and Sakon Yamamoto as their official test drivers.

The car carries a similar livery and sponsorship to 2007: ING are still the title sponsor, but Pepe Jeans has now been added as a sponsor, along with returnee Spanish insurance firm Mutua Madrileña. Mutua Madrileña had been a sponsor of the McLaren-Mercedes team in 2007, but chose to follow Alonso when he left McLaren after only one year due to Alonso's personal sponsors.

2008 season

Testing
Renault made strong progress throughout the early 2008 testing schedule, with Alonso consistently at the top end of the timesheets. The Spaniard has commented that the team are "able to keep improving our understanding of the Bridgestone tyres, and also the new way of setting up the car with no traction control or engine braking". The team made some improvements at a later test in Jerez, despite difficult windy weather conditions.

Later uses 
On April 9, 2009, during Renault's promotional tour in Dubai, Mohammed Ben Sulayem was invited to test drive the Renault R28 at the Dubai Autodrome. 100 meters after the start, he lost control of his car and crashed into the pit wall. The car was destroyed, but Ben Sulayem survived uninjured.

Complete Formula One results 
(key) (results in bold indicate pole position)

Notes and references

External links

 Renault F1 R28 Tech Specs
 R28 Technical Specification

R28
2008 Formula One season cars